Kacper Michalski (born 3 January 2000) is a Polish professional footballer who plays as a right-back for Ruch Chorzów.

Career

GKS Katowice
On 16 July 2019, Michalski was sold to GKS Katowice in the Polish II liga.

Return to Górnik Zabrze
On 19 August 2020, Górnik Zabrze activated the buy-back option that was included in the transfer to GKS. Michalski signed a new two-year contract with Górnik. On 1 September 2021, he was loaned to II liga side Wigry Suwałki until the end of the year.

Ruch Chorzów
On 22 June 2022, Michalski joined Górnik's main local rivals, I liga side Ruch Chorzów, on a two-year deal.

References

External links
Kacper Michalski at PZPN

2000 births
People from Kostrzyn nad Odrą
Sportspeople from Lubusz Voivodeship
Living people
Polish footballers
Poland youth international footballers
Association football defenders
Górnik Zabrze players
GKS Katowice players
Wigry Suwałki players
Ruch Chorzów players
Ekstraklasa players
II liga players
III liga players